The following is a list of countries by refined copper exports. Data is for 2012 and 2018, in millions of United States dollars, as reported by The Observatory of Economic Complexity. Currently the top ten countries are listed.

References

 Observatory of Economic complexity - Countries that export Refined Copper (2012)

Copper
Exports
Copper, exports by country